Struthers Library Building, also known as the Library Theatre, is a historic library and theatre building located at Warren, Warren County, Pennsylvania.  It was built in 1883, and is a red brick building in three sections.  It measures 73 feet wide by 162 feet deep.  The front section is three stories high with a corner tower.  The second floor housed a library and the third a meeting hall, which was originally used as the town's Masonic Temple.  It has a marquee on the front elevation.  Behind the front section is the auditorium and behind that a three-story section with dressing rooms and stage. The auditorium was originally built as a Victorian opera house.  The building was renovated in 1919 by the architectural firm of Warren and Wetmore. During the 1919 renovation, the auditorium was modified to make it suitable for movies and traveling vaudeville shows. In 1983, the auditorium underwent an extensive restoration, preserving the details of the 1919 renovation.

It was added to the National Register of Historic Places in 1975.

References

Theatres on the National Register of Historic Places in Pennsylvania
Libraries on the National Register of Historic Places in Pennsylvania
Theatres completed in 1883
Library buildings completed in 1883
Buildings and structures in Warren, Pennsylvania
National Register of Historic Places in Warren County, Pennsylvania